The Freezing Atlantic is Aberdeen City's debut album. Its first single is "God Is Going to Get Sick of Me." It was produced by Nic Hard (Jesse Malin, The Church, The Bravery) for the 2005 release on Dovecote Records.  Select tracks from the album were re-recorded and remixed with Steve Lillywhite for the 2006 re-release of the records on Sony's Red Ink/Columbia imprint.  The album was re-released on August 8, 2006.

Track listing
 "Another Seven Years" – 3:49
 "Pretty Pet" – 4:52
 "God Is Going To Get Sick Of Me" – 3:27
 "Sixty Lives" – 4:05
 "The Arrival" – 5:00
 "In Combat" – 4:10
 "Stay Still" – 6:03
 "Brighton" – 7:26
 "Best Chances Are Gone" – 3:24
 "Mercy" – 4:05

Personnel
Ryan Heller – guitar
Chris McLaughlin – guitar/vocals
Rob McCaffrey – drums
Brad Parker – vocals/bass

2005 debut albums
Dovecote Records albums
Aberdeen City (band) albums